The XM250 is the U.S. military designation for the SIG-LMG, a 6.8×51mm, gas-operated, belt-fed, light machine gun designed by SIG Sauer for the U.S. Army's Next Generation Squad Weapon Program in 2022 to replace the M249 light machine gun. The XM250 features a free-floating reinforced M-LOK handguard for direct accessory attachment onto the "negative space" (hollow slot) mounting points.

History 
In January 2019, the United States military began the Next Generation Squad Weapon Program to find replacements for the M4 carbine and M249 light machine gun. In September 2019, SIG Sauer submitted their designs. The XM250 and XM7 rifle were designed to fire the 6.8×51mm SIG Fury cartridge in response to concerns that improvements in body armor would diminish the effectiveness of common battlefield rounds such as the 5.56×45mm NATO (used in the M4 and M249) and 7.62×51mm NATO.

On 19 April 2022, the United States Army awarded a 10-year contract to SIG Sauer to produce the XM250 automatic rifle, along with the XM7 rifle rifle, to replace the M249 and M4, respectively; the names were chosen as the next numbers sequentially to the weapons they will replace (the rifle was original designated the XM5, but was later changed to XM7). The first batch of twenty-five XM7s and fifteen XM250s are planned to be delivered in late 2023. In total, the Army plans to procure a total of 107,000 rifles and 13,000 automatic rifles for close combat forces. The contract has the capacity to build additional weapons should the U.S. Marine Corps and U.S. Special Operations Command choose to be included.

Compared to the M249 weighing  unsuppressed with a basic combat load of 600 rounds in three 200-round pouches weighing , the XM250 weighs about  less and a gunner carries roughly a  heavier load with 200 fewer rounds. The barrel on the XM250 is not considered to be a quick-change barrel and the stock is collapsible but non-folding.

The XM250, XM7, the Vortex Optics XM157 Fire Control Optic platform agnostic unit, and the 6.8×51mm ammunition are expected to be delivered to the first U.S. Army unit for operational testing by October 2023. Operational testing does not guarantee actual widespread future issue.

See also 
 
 SIG Sauer M17

References

External links 
 

6.8mm firearms
Machine guns of the United States
SIG Sauer machine guns
Weapons and ammunition introduced in 2019